The girls' halfpipe event at the 2016 Winter Youth  Olympics took place on 14 February at the Oslo Vinterpark.

Results

References

External links
Results
 

Freestyle skiing at the 2016 Winter Youth Olympics